BMTA may refer to:

 Bangkok Mass Transit Authority, the main public bus operator in Bangkok, Thailand
 Benton MacKaye Trail Association, a United States-based organization
 Bolivarian Military Technical Academy, a Venezuelan military academy attached to the UMBV